Bulgarian-Slovenian relations are foreign relations between Bulgaria and Slovenia. Bulgaria has an embassy in Ljubljana. Slovenia is represented in Bulgaria through its embassy in Budapest (Hungary).   
Both countries are members of the European Union and NATO.

See also 
 Foreign relations of Bulgaria
 Foreign relations of Slovenia
 Bulgaria–Yugoslavia relations

External links
  Bulgarian embassy in Ljubljana
  Slovenian Foreign Ministry: directions of diplomatic representation of both countries

 
Slovenia 
Bilateral relations of Slovenia